Kehelland is a hamlet northwest of  Camborne in west Cornwall, England.

References

Hamlets in Cornwall